Manoury Island is an island lying  south of Gand Island at the north end of Schollaert Channel, in the Palmer Archipelago, Antarctica. It was discovered by the French Antarctic Expedition, 1903–05, and named by Jean-Baptiste Charcot for G. Manoury, secretary of the expedition.

See also 
 List of Antarctic and sub-Antarctic islands

References

Islands of the Palmer Archipelago